José Antonio "Toni" Seligrat Bernal (born 20 October 1968) is a Spanish retired footballer who played as a defensive midfielder. He is the current assistant manager of Valencia CF.

Playing career
Born in Torrent, Valencian Community, Seligrat never played in any division higher than Tercera División. He began his career with hometown side Torrent CF, and went on to represent CF Balaguer, CF Borges Blanques, UE Lleida's reserves, CF Tremp, UD Fraga, CD Binéfar, UD Barbastro and UD Alcampell, where he retired in 2002 at the age of 33.

Coaching career
Immediately after retiring Seligrat took up coaching, being named manager of his last club Alcampell. For the 2003–04 season, he took over CD Teruel in the fourth division, but was sacked in May 2004.

Seligrat was appointed at fourth tier side Atlètic Ciutadella CF in August 2004, moving to fellow league team CF Sporting Mahonés the following June. On 4 June 2007, he left the latter club to join Juan Carlos Oliva's staff at Superleague Greece side Aris Thessaloniki FC, but left the club shortly after Oliva was sacked, just a few months later.

Upon returning to Spain, Seligrat was named in charge of CF Gandía in May 2008, and managed to achieve promotion to Segunda División B with the club in 2010. He subsequently left the club for CD Olímpic de Xàtiva, whom he also helped promote to the third division in 2011.

On 18 June 2012, Seligrat was appointed manager of third division side Lleida Esportiu. At the club, he managed to reach the promotion play-offs twice, but was knocked out in both times; he subsequently left the club.

On 24 November 2014, Seligrat took over Huracán Valencia CF, still in the third tier. On 9 October 2015, he resigned, and was appointed in charge of CD Alcoyano the following 20 May.

On 22 June 2017, Seligrat was named manager of CE Sabadell FC, still in the third division. He was sacked by the club on 14 January 2019, after nearly fighting with the club's supporters in his last match in charge.

On 17 November 2019, Seligrat was appointed at Gimnàstic de Tarragona, freshly relegated to the third division. The following 11 June, he renewed his contract with the club until 2021.

Seligrat left Nàstic on 12 May 2021, as his contract ended. On 18 June, he was named in charge of Deportivo Alavés' reserves in Tercera División RFEF.

Seligrat left the Miniglorias on 16 June 2022, and returned to Lleida on 28 December. The following 2 February, he left the club and became Voro's assistant at Valencia CF; twelve days later, despite the managerial change to Rubén Baraja, he was kept as an assistant.

Managerial statistics

References

External links

1968 births
Living people
People from Torrent, Valencia
Sportspeople from the Province of Valencia
Spanish footballers
Footballers from the Valencian Community
Association football midfielders
Tercera División players
Divisiones Regionales de Fútbol players
CF Balaguer footballers
CD Binéfar players
UD Barbastro players
Spanish football managers
Segunda División B managers
Lleida Esportiu managers
Huracán Valencia CF managers
CD Alcoyano managers
CE Sabadell FC managers
Gimnàstic de Tarragona managers
CF Gandía managers
Deportivo Alavés B managers
Valencia CF non-playing staff